Anderson Lake State Fish and Wildlife Area is an Illinois state park on  in Fulton County, Illinois, United States. A small part at the southern end extends into Schuyler County. Anderson Lake is located in the area.

References

State parks of Illinois
Protected areas of Fulton County, Illinois
Lakes of Illinois
Protected areas of Schuyler County, Illinois
Protected areas established in 1947
1947 establishments in Illinois
Landforms of Schuyler County, Illinois
Landforms of Fulton County, Illinois